Korda Studios (in Hungarian: Korda Filmstúdió) is a film studio complex (26 km west of Budapest) in the wine-making village of Etyek; hence the media nickname Etyekwood. It is built on the site of a former barracks. The studio is named after Sir Alexander Korda, Hungarian born British film producer and director and screenwriter, who founded his own film production studios and film distribution company, Denham Film Studios in Buckinghamshire, England.

Korda Studios were inaugurated in April 2007. Altogether six studios were built from a total budget of 90 million Euros. It boasts a sound stage of 5,975 square metres (64,314 sq feet) which is claimed to be the biggest of its kind in the world. The "superstage" was delivered in 2009. The entire project was financed from private capital investment. The main shareholders are Sándor Demján, Andy Vajna, Peter Munk and Nathaniel Philip Rothschild.

Specialising in designing film studios, Bastien and Associates Inc. of the United States, made the architectural designs and Iparterv Épülettervező Zrt. of Budapest made the permit designs and as-built plans. The investors originally planned to implement the project in three phases. The studios use the most developed technology and feature all supporting service facilities including wardrobes, make-up rooms and offices. The complex also has a 50-seat screening room.

The first film produced at Korda Studios was Hellboy II: The Golden Army of Universal Studios, directed by Guillermo del Toro. Most scenes of television series The Last Kingdom, originally produced by the BBC and later by Netflix, was also filmed here; in early January 2018, it will start pre-production for Series 4.

Fact sheet 

 6 state of the art sound stages on 15,000 square metres
 One of the biggest soundstages in the world with an area of 6,000 square metres and net buildable height of 20 m
 More than 2,800 square metres of production accommodations
 Nearly 7,000 square metres of warehouse and workshop areas
 15 hectares (37 acres) of empty backlot space suitable for set construction
 10 hectares of backlot sets: New York, Renaissance and Medieval

Studios and sizes 
Korda Studios has 6 state of the art sound stages meeting the industry’s highest level of expectations:
 All stages are soundproof and allow for direct sound recording
 Built-in lighting and scenic bridges with rigging points are able to hold 500 kg per intersection points, and 200 kg per sections
 Silent ventilation and full climate control
 Independent and redundant high voltage power network
 Redundant fiber optic network and WIFI
 Fire detection and extinguishing system
 Remote controlled smoke extraction
 Attached dimmer and local storage rooms
 Direct access to production buildings
 Large elephant doors

Stage 1: 1946 square metre. 49.4 x 39.4 metre. 10.75 metre internal height including 10 x 10 x 4 metre watertank

Stage 2: 1769 square metre. 49.4 x 39.4. 10.75 metre internal height

Stage 3: 1769 square metre. 49.4 x 39.4. 10.75 metre internal height

Stage 4: 961 square metre. 24.4 x 39.4. 10.75 metre internal height

Stage 5: 2205 square metre. 37 x 59.6. 13.75 metre internal height

Stage 6:  5856 square metre. 96 x 61. 20 metre internal height

Backlot sets

New York/Brooklyn Set
Built for Hellboy II: The Golden Army, the backlot includes a full Brooklyn street block with four-story facades on sides, a movie theater, bank, restaurant, repair shop, freight loading docks and fire escapes. The length of the main street is 120 meters which runs into 60 meter long side streets at each end. The width of the paved road is 14.5 meters, with 3-4 meter sidewalks on each side. The large backlot area makes it possible to extend the set on all sides. The street façade can be modified to suit production’s needs.

Renaissance Set
The backlot was designed by Francois Seguin & Jonathan McKinstry for The Borgias TV series. It portrays numerous regions of historical Italy, from The Vatican to Florence. The more than 1 hectare renaissance city has various styled buildings and gates, courtyards, alleys, interiors, prison cell, a piazza and Vatican façade.

Medieval Village Set
Built for the World Without End miniseries, the 12,000 square meter set is situated in a natural environment next to a lake and forest. The set portrays a village from the 13-14th century with various houses, fortress wall, central square and ambulatory. Most of the houses include interiors.

References

External links

Company website

Buildings and structures in Fejér County
 
Film production companies of Hungary
Film production companies of the United States
Film location shooting